Alas River is a river in Aceh in northeastern Sumatra, Indonesia, about 1400 km northwest of the capital Jakarta. It is known for its white water rafting.
The banks of the rivers are inhabited by the Alas people.

Geography
The river flows in the northern area of Sumatra with predominantly tropical rainforest climate (designated as Af in the Köppen-Geiger climate classification). The annual average temperature in the area is 22 °C. The warmest month is March, when the average temperature is around 23 °C, and the coldest is June, at 21 °C. The average annual rainfall is 2943 mm. The wettest month is December, with an average of 370 mm rainfall, and the driest is June, with 82 mm rainfall.

See also
List of rivers of Indonesia
List of rivers of Sumatra
Alas people

References 

Rivers of Aceh
Rivers of Indonesia